Alexandra Malzer also referred to as 'Malzer' (born 18 August 2000) is an English international field hockey player who plays as a midfielder for England and Great Britain.

She plays club hockey in the British Universities and Colleges Sport (BUCS) league for University of Nottingham.

Alex previously represented the England U16 and U18 national side winning a European bronze with the U18 team in the summer of 2018. 

Malzer has also played for East Grinstead.

References

External links

2000 births
Living people
English female field hockey players
Women's England Hockey League players
East Grinstead Hockey Club players
Female field hockey midfielders